Anthony St. John Baker (1785 – 16 May 1854) was a British diplomat and Royal Navy officer serving in His Majesty's Foreign Service during England's Regency era.

Biography
During March 1809 to August 1812, British ministers to the United States Anthony Baker and Augustus Foster conveyed Great Britain's Chargé d'affaires administering correspondence to Viscount Castlereagh who became Britain's Secretary of State for Foreign Affairs on March 4, 1812.

Anthony S.J. Baker arrived in the United States in 1812 serving as Secretary of the British Legation. He was summoned in 1813 by the Parliament of Great Britain to serve as Secretary of a British Commission charged with arbitration of the Treaty of Ghent quelling the War of 1812. After ratification by George IV at the Carlton House on December 27, 1814, Henry Carroll and Anthony Baker, who possessed the British ratified peace treaty, boarded the British sloop ship HMS Favorite on January 2, 1815 for a voyage to Colonial America arriving in Lower New York Bay under a flag of truce on February 11, 1815. Upon Charles Bagot term as British Ambassador to North America in 1820, Anthony Baker remained in Colonial America fulfilling the role of British Consul General serving until 1832.

Royal Navy officer Anthony Baker authored an autobiography published in 1850 four years before his death occurring in Tunbridge Wells, Kent, England on May 16, 1854.

See also

British Peace Treaty Commission at Ghent, United Netherlands
William Adams
James Gambier
Henry Goulburn

References

U.S. Secretary of State Letters of Anthony St. John Baker

British Legation in Washington, D.C.

External links
 
 
 
 
 
 
 
  

1785 births
1854 deaths
Ambassadors of the United Kingdom to the United States
British people of the War of 1812